Mojo (from Portuguese molho , meaning "sauce") is the name, or abbreviated name, of several types of sauces, varying in spiciness, consisting primarily of olive oil, local pepper varieties (called pimienta in the Canary Islands), garlic, paprika (called pimentón in Spain), cumin or coriander, and other spices. Mojo originated in the Canary Islands, where the main varieties are green mojo (mojo verde), red mojo (mojo rojo), and spicy red mojo (mojo picón). Other countries have recipes similar to mojo, where acidic ingredients such as vinegar, lemon, orange, or lime juice may be used.

Canarian mojo

Typology 

Green mojo, or mojo containing green spices, is commonly used for fish, especially the proper green mojo (made with green pepper) but also coriander mojo (mojo de cilantro) and parsley mojo (mojo de perejil). As coriander mojo and parsley mojo contain some water, they need to be kept in the refrigerator and have to be consumed within two days after preparation.

Red mojo, made of small red peppers from La Palma (called pimienta picona or pimienta palmera) and paprika, is usually eaten with meat. Red and green mojo can be used interchangeably to season some dishes, prominently papas arrugadas con salsa mojo, or potatoes with mojo. Mojo is also commonly served with fresh bread rolls at the beginning of a meal.

Preparation 

To prepare red mojo, it is necessary to dry the peppers. Once dry, peppers can be kept for a long time before preparation. Before making mojo, peppers are soaked in water, so they lose their spiciness. Then, grains and fibers are removed, but for a few, that will make the mojo spicy. In the case of green mojo, spiciness will be regulated by the amount of garlic and can also be intensified by adding ground coriander seeds.

Canarian variations 

Local variations of mojo include recipes with cheese, such as mojo con queso (mojo with cheese) from La Palma and El Hierro, as well as almogrote from La Gomera, where it is turned it into a paste that can be spread over bread. Every Canarian family has its own mojo recipe, which can vary greatly in flavour, spiciness, and texture. There is also almond mojo, an ideal accompaniment to various roasted dishes. Saffron mojo, whose main ingredient is Canarian saffron, tastes excellent with any fried cheese. Garlic mojo is ideal on pizza. Herb mojo is made of mixed spices and is ideal for any salad.

International variations 

Similar sauces, also known as mojo, are also popular in Cuba and throughout the islands of the Caribbean, Hispanic or non-Hispanic, due to heavy Canarian emigration to the Caribbean, and have even influenced some barbecue sauces in the Deep South region of the United States, particularly the states of Florida, Texas, and Louisiana.  The flavor can be made of almost everything, from tomato or pepper to avocado. 

In Cuban cooking, mojo applies to any sauce made with garlic, olive oil, or pork lard, and a citrus juice, traditionally bitter orange juice. It is commonly used to marinate roast pork or as a dip for plantain chips and fried cassava (yuca frita).  The sauce is occasionally called by its diminutive, 'mojito,' but should not be confused with the beverage of the same name. To create the marinade for pork, the ingredients are bitter orange juice, garlic, oregano, cumin, and salt.

In Puerto Rico, mojo is a herb sauce of finely chopped cilantro or parsley with salt, plenty of crushed garlic, and olive oil. Black pepper, butter, grated onion, vinegar, and any citrus fruit can also be added. It is commonly used on the island as a marinade for chicken roast and a dip for tostones, fried cassava, and sometimes mashed with mofongo. Puerto Rican Chef Jose Enrique mojo mixed with papaya and avocado topped on fish has become a part of Puerto Rican gastronomy. There is also a version popular in the town of Salinas, called mojo isleño, which is served with seafood, particularly fish.

In the Dominican Republic, it is called wasakaka and is used as a sauce for roasted chicken and boiled cassava. Wasakaka is made of boiling plenty of water with parsley, garlic, olive oil, and sour orange or lime juice.

See also

 Aioli
 Garlic sauce
Green sauce
 List of sauces

References

 Recipes for mojo sauce

Canary Islands cuisine
Caribbean cuisine
Chili sauce and paste
Cuban cuisine
Puerto Rican cuisine
Sauces